Jenningsville is an unincorporated community in Wyoming County, in the U.S. state of Pennsylvania.

History
A post office called Jenningsville was established in 1856, and remained in operation until 1911. The community has the name of J. T. and William N. Jennings, proprietors of a local mill.

Notable person
Frederick Palen, a businessperson in the shipping industry, was born at Jenningsville in 1872.

References

Unincorporated communities in Wyoming County, Pennsylvania
Unincorporated communities in Pennsylvania